Krakaudorf is a former municipality in the district of Murau in Styria, Austria. Since the 2015 Styria municipal structural reform, it is part of the municipality Krakau.

Geography
Krakaudorf lies on a high plateau in the south of the Schladming Tauern.

References

Cities and towns in Murau District